The 1993 Big East Conference softball tournament was held at Connecticut Softball Stadium in Storrs, Connecticut. The tournament, hosted by the University of Connecticut, ran April 23 and April 24, 1993 and determined the champion for the Big East Conference for the 1993 NCAA Division I softball season.  Top-seeded Connecticut won the tournament for the fourth time and earned the Big East Conference's automatic bid to the 1993 NCAA Division I softball tournament.

Format and seeding
The top four teams from the conference's round-robin regular season qualified for the tournament, and were seeded one through four.  They played a double-elimination tournament.

Tournament

Most Outstanding Player
Janna Venice was named Tournament Most Outstanding Player.  Venice was an outfielder for Connecticut.

References

Big East Tournament
Big East Conference softball tournament
Big East Conference softball tournament